Kornegay is a surname. Notable people by that name include:

 George Paul Kornegay (1913–2014), was an American folk and outsider artist. 
 Horace R. Kornegay (1924–2009), U.S. Representative from North Carolina. 
 Charles Kornegay (born 1974), American-Spanish basketball player.
 W. H. Kornegay  (1865–1935), attorney in private practice in Vinita, Oklahoma.
 Tad Kornegay, retired professional Canadian football defensive back.